Theater Mär is a theatre in Hamburg, Germany.

Theatres in Hamburg